"Heavy Metal Kings" is a single by hip hop duo Jedi Mind Tricks, released in 2006 through Babygrande Records. The single was released in a limited edition blue vinyl pressing, with every copy signed by group vocalist Vinnie Paz. "Heavy Metal Kings" is the lead single from the group's fifth album, Servants in Heaven, Kings in Hell. The song features a sample from "Boiling Rage (Estuans Interius)" by German composer Carl Orff, taken from his famous cantata Carmina Burana, and a vocal sample from "Front Lines (Hell on Earth)" by Mobb Deep for the chorus. "Heavy Metal Kings" features a guest verse from former Non Phixion member Ill Bill. The song's music video was released shortly before the album's release, and featured guest appearances from the group's DJ, DJ Kwestion, and R.A. the Rugged Man.

This single inspired the rap duo of Ill Bill & Vinnie Paz in 2010 as Heavy Metal Kings.

Track listing

A-side
"Heavy Metal Kings" (Dirty Version) (feat. Ill Bill)
"Heavy Metal Kings" (Clean Version) (feat. Ill Bill)

B-side
"Heavy Metal Kings" (Instrumental)
"Heavy Metal Kings" (Accapella) (feat. Ill Bill)

Song order
First verse: Vinnie Paz
Second verse: Ill Bill
Third verse: Vinnie Paz
Chorus: Vinnie Paz

References

External links
"Heavy Metal Kings" music video
www.heavymetalkings.com

2006 singles
2006 songs
Jedi Mind Tricks songs